Damon Wilson is an American football coach. He is the head football coach at Morgan State University in Baltimore. Wilson was previously the head football coach at Bowie State University in Bowie, Maryland for 12 years, from 2009 through May 2022. Wilson played college football at Bowie State, earning all-Central Intercollegiate Athletic Association (CIAA) honors in 1997 and 1998.

Head coaching record

References

External links
 Bowie State profile

Year of birth missing (living people)
Living people
Bowie State Bulldogs football coaches
Bowie State Bulldogs football players
Morgan State Bears football coaches
Prairie View A&M Panthers football coaches
Texas Southern Tigers football coaches
African-American coaches of American football
African-American players of American football
20th-century African-American sportspeople
21st-century African-American sportspeople